Paços de Brandão is a Portuguese parish in the municipality of Santa Maria da Feira, and Aveiro District. The population in 2011 was 4,867, in an area of 3.56 km2. It is 22 km from Porto, and is part of the Porto Metropolitan Area.

Its foundation dates back to more than 900 years ago, associated with the Norman Fernand Blandon. It became a town in 1985.

Among its highlights is the Festa dos Arcos, which occurs every August in the center of the town, and Inês Lopo, a notable nuclear medicine resident and marathon runner.

Sites of interest
Casa da Quinta do Engenho Novo or Parque Municipal de Paços de Brandão (literally the Paços de Brandão Municipal Park)
Casa da Portela
Mother Church

Education

Instituto Superior de Paços de Brandão

Sporting clubs

Clube Desportivo de Paços de Brandão
Grupo Recreativo Independente Brandoense (Basketball)

Firms
Suspeita Productions - Design and Fashion Firm
http://www.numerica-multimedia.pt  Editora discográfica e Multimedia

Gallery

References

External links
Parish official website

Freguesias of Santa Maria da Feira
Towns in Portugal